Two North Dakota Fighting Hawks basketball programs are part of the school's athletics program:

 North Dakota Fighting Hawks men's basketball
 North Dakota Fighting Hawks women's basketball

North Dakota Fighting Hawks basketball